Lead line ("Leed" line)  may refer to:
Lead line, used in depth sounding 
Leadline, a horse show class for children
Lead (tack), for leading livestock
Leash, for dogs and other small animals

And also to ("Led" line):
Burton line, a symptom of lead poisoning
Sounding line, an instrument used in navigation to measure water depth (the plummet, or weight, is usually composed of lead)
Radiation shielding: "lead-lined" containers for shielding radiation